Georgi Tartov (Bulgarian: Георги Търтов; born 3 December 1998) is a Bulgarian footballer who plays as a midfielder for Hebar Pazardzhik.

Career

CSKA Sofia
On 31 May 2017 he made his debut for CSKA Sofia in match against Dunav Ruse.

Litex Lovech
On 14 June 2017 he returned in his youth club Litex Lovech.

Career statistics

Club

References

External links
 

1998 births
Living people
Bulgarian footballers
PFC CSKA Sofia players
PFC Litex Lovech players
FC Botev Galabovo players
FC Kariana Erden players
First Professional Football League (Bulgaria) players
Second Professional Football League (Bulgaria) players
Association football midfielders